Robert Patrick Brannigan (18 October 1918 – 4 March 1997) was an Irish hurler who played for Kilkenny Senior Championship club James Stephens. He played for the Kilkenny senior hurling team on a number of occasions, during which time he usually lined out as a left wing-forward.

Honours

Kilkenny
All-Ireland Senior Hurling Championship (1): 1939
Leinster Senior Hurling Championship (1): 1939
All-Ireland Minor Hurling Championship (2): 1935, 1936
Leinster Minor Hurling Championship (2): 1935, 1936

References

1918 births
1997 deaths
All-Ireland Senior Hurling Championship winners
Irish plumbers
James Stephens hurlers
Kilkenny inter-county hurlers